The Victorian Railways F class locomotives were built in 1874 (the pattern engine), 1876–77 and 1879–80 by Beyer, Peacock & Company and the Phoenix Foundry in Ballarat as 2-4-0 tender locomotives. They were normally used on passenger trains. In 1911 the Victorian Railways decided to convert seven of them into "motor" locomotives. These became 2-4-2 tanks. They kept their numbers 172–184 (evens only). The unrebuilt tender engines were taken off register between 1916 and 1922. The "motors" were taken off register between 1920 and 1929. One of the class, number 176, survived after being sold to Sunshine Harvester Works in 1920, where it stayed there shunting until 1961. It was then donated to the Newport Railway Museum in North Williamstown and is now the oldest surviving Victorian Railway locomotive, being built in 1880.

External links
 Victorian Preserved Steam Locomotives detailed information about all surviving ex-VR steam locos.
 Diagram of 2-4-0 F class locomotive
 Diagram of 2-4-2T F class locomotive
 Picture of F 172
 Pattern engine 98
 F 182

References

F class
Broad gauge locomotives in Australia
2-4-0 locomotives
2-4-2T locomotives